Edward Oxford (18 April 1822 – 23 April 1900) was the first of seven people who tried to assassinate Queen Victoria. After Oxford was arrested and charged with treason, a jury found that Oxford was not guilty by reason of insanity and he was detained at Her Majesty's pleasure in the State Criminal Lunatic Asylum and later, in Broadmoor Hospital. Eventually given conditional release for transportation to a British colony, he lived out the remainder of his life in Australia. He remains the longest-surviving attempted assassin of a British monarch.

Early life
Edward was born in Birmingham in 1822, the third of Hannah Marklew and George Oxford's seven children. His father, a gold chaser, died when he was seven. His mother was able to find work and support the family, which meant Edward was able to attend school both in Birmingham and the Lambeth area of London, where the family moved when he was about 10. When Oxford left school, he first took bar work with his aunt in Hounslow, then in other public houses as a pot boy, or waiter.  At the time of the attack he was barely eighteen years old, unemployed and living with his mother and sister in lodgings in Camberwell, having recently quit his job at the Hog-in-the-Pound in Oxford Street. Since his mother had returned to Birmingham on a regular trip to see family over a month before, Oxford was, in effect, living alone at the time of the event.

The assassination attempt
On 4 May 1840, he bought a pair of pistols for £2, as well as a gunpowder flask, and began practising in various shooting galleries in Leicester Square, the Strand and the West End. A week before the attack, he went into a Lambeth shop owned by a former schoolmate named Gray and bought fifty copper percussion caps, and enquired where he could buy some bullets and three-pennies' worth of gunpowder. Gray sold him the powder, and told him where he could find the ammunition. On the evening of 9 June he showed several witnesses what appeared to be a loaded pistol; when he was asked what he planned to do with it, he refused to say, other than stating that he had been firing at a target.

At about 4:00 PM on 10 June 1840, Oxford took up a position on a footpath at Constitution Hill, near Buckingham Palace. The Queen, who was four months pregnant with her first child, was accustomed to riding out in a phaeton, or low, open horse-drawn carriage, with her husband, Prince Albert in the late afternoon or early evening, with no other escort than two outriders. When the royal couple appeared some two hours later and drew level with him, he fired both pistols in succession, missing both times. He was immediately seized by onlookers and disarmed. Oxford made no attempt to hide his actions, openly declaring: "It was I, it was me that did it."

He was immediately arrested and charged with treason for attempting to assassinate the sovereign. When he was taken into custody at the police station he asked if the Queen was hurt; he was informed she was unharmed. When he was asked if the pistols had been loaded, he said they were. After his arrest, his lodgings were searched and a locked box was found containing a sword and scabbard, two pistol-bags, powder, a bullet-mould, five lead balls, some of the percussion caps bought from Gray, and the intricate rules and proceedings of an imaginary military society called "Young England" (not to be confused with the later conservative political group of the same name), complete with a list of made-up officers and correspondence. Members were to be armed with a brace of pistols, a sword, a rifle and a dagger.

Oxford's trial at the Old Bailey was postponed until 9 July, after a thorough investigation was made of both his background and his possible motives. In spite of his earlier admissions, no bullets could be found at the scene, so that the Crown could not prove that the pistols were, in fact, armed and that he could have harmed anyone. Oxford later claimed that the guns contained only gunpowder.

Oxford appeared to be oblivious for most of the proceedings. The prosecution presented much eyewitness evidence, while the defence case consisted of various family members and friends who testified that Oxford had always seemed of unsound mind, and that both his grandfather and father were alcoholics who had exhibited signs of mental illness. This carried a great deal of weight, as it was thought during this time that both drink and hereditary influence were strong causal factors for insanity. Oxford's mother testified her late husband had been violent and intimidating, and that her son was not only prone to fits of hysterical laughter and emitting strange noises, he had been obsessed with firearms since he was a child. Various eminent pathologists and physicians testified that due to "brain disease" or other factors, such as the shape of his head, Oxford was either a mental imbecile or simply incapable of controlling himself.

Commitment

The following day, the jury acquitted Oxford, declaring him to be "not guilty by reason of insanity". Like all such prisoners, he was sentenced to be detained "until Her Majesty's pleasure be known". In effect, this was an indefinite sentence, and the source of the asylum term "pleasure men". Oxford was sent to the State Criminal Lunatic Asylum in Bethlem, Southwark, where he remained as a model patient for the next twenty-four years. The doctors at Bethlem and every other medical professional who met him during his confinement considered him sane. During his time at Bethlem, he occupied himself by drawing, reading and learning to play the violin; the Bethlem doctors reported that he could play draughts and chess better than any other patient. He also learnt French, German and Italian to a degree of fluency, acquired some knowledge of Spanish, Greek and Latin, and was employed as a painter and decorator within the confines of the hospital. He wrote poetry as well, with his last surviving poem consoling Queen Victoria over the death of her husband. When he was transferred to Broadmoor Hospital in 1864, the notes taken on his arrival describe him as "apparently sane". He still claimed the pistols he fired at the Queen were not loaded with anything other than powder, and that his attack was fuelled not by a desire to injure her, but purely by a desire for notoriety.

Oxford continued to be orderly and well-behaved at Broadmoor, working as a wood grainer and painter. While it was clear to the hospital's governors that Oxford was of sound mind and no longer a threat to society, Sir George Grey, the Home Secretary, ignored the request to order his release. It is possible that since he had been the Judge Advocate General at the time of Oxford's trial, he could have been reluctant to discharge a prisoner he once had an interest in incarcerating.  It was not until three years later that a new Home Secretary offered to discharge Oxford, on the condition that he leave for one of the Empire's overseas colonies, and, if he returned to Great Britain or Ireland, he would be incarcerated for life.

The warrant for Oxford's release arrived at Broadmoor in October 1867, and his passage to Australia was arranged for one month later. On 26 November 1867, Oxford travelled to Plymouth, accompanied by Charles Phelps, the steward at Broadmoor. The following day, he boarded a ship bound for Melbourne. He landed in Melbourne on 20 February 1868.

Later life
Oxford lived out the rest of his life in Melbourne, Australia. Oxford landed in Melbourne with a new alias, John Freeman. Setting out to reform himself and become a respectable citizen, Freeman became a house painter and joined the West Melbourne Mutual Improvement Society. In 1881 he married a widow, Jane Bowen, becoming a stepfather to her two children, became a church warden at St Paul's Cathedral. He settled in the Albert Park neighbourhood. Under the pseudonym "Liber" he wrote articles for The Argus about the city's slums, markets and racetracks, and these became the basis for an 1888 book, Lights and Shadows of Melbourne Life. Freeman died in 1900.

His patient record at Broadmoor includes a letter sent in 1883 by George Haydon, a Steward at Bethlem, to Dr. David Nicolson. It includes an article from The Age, a Melbourne newspaper, which reports that on 4 May 1880, a "John" Oxford, identified as the man who shot at the Queen many years ago, and who had subsequently been a patient in an asylum before he was discharged to Australia, had recently been convicted of stealing a shirt and spent a week in jail. Upon his release, the prison governor requested the police to keep an eye on him, "in consequence of the old man’s eccentric conduct". The police subsequently arrested Oxford for vagrancy, and he was reportedly remanded for further medical examination. There were no further updates to the record. It is not certain that this person was Edward Oxford (who was then aged 58).

The connection between Oxford and "John Freeman" was established by F. B. Smith's 1987 article "Lights and Shadows in the Life of John Freeman". Freeman wrote several letters to Haydon, beginning in 1888 and apparently ceasing on Haydon's death in 1889. Freeman's wife and stepchildren appear to have been totally ignorant that he might be anyone other than John Freeman. In a letter to Haydon, Freeman wrote "even my wife, the sharer of my joys and sorrows is no wiser than the rest of the world." Additionally, a photograph of John Freeman taken for the 1888 Centennial Exhibition in Melbourne matches a portrait of Oxford held in the archives of the Bethlem asylum. Freeman's correspondence to Haydon was donated to the National Library in the 1950s by the family. Stevens points out that the former Steward contributed nothing more to Oxford's Broadmoor record about his progress beyond the troubling report published in the newspaper, and never confirmed that Oxford was the author of Freeman's book. This may have been because Haydon was departing Bethlem at the time he began receiving the letters. In his correspondence with Haydon, Freeman expressed regret for the anguish to his family and the Queen that his actions had caused.

Aftermath
Despite the historical precedent of the insanity defence, Queen Victoria represented popular opinion when she remained morally convinced that Oxford and other malefactors who came after him were perfectly cognisant of their actions. She was furious when Daniel M'Naghten, who attempted to assassinate Prime Minister Sir Robert Peel and instead killed his private secretary, was acquitted in 1843. When Roderick McLean attempted to shoot her on the Windsor railway platform forty years later and was sent to Broadmoor, her response was to demand of Prime Minister Gladstone that the law be changed to "guilty but insane", to better accommodate her unwavering belief that if Oxford had only been hanged at the outset, his death would have acted as a deterrent to other potential regicides:

In fiction

A contemporary reference to Oxford appears in Charles Dickens' The Old Curiosity Shop, the novel that Dickens was writing during the months before and after the attempted regicide. Although Dickens took a strong interest in the case, Oxford appears not in Dickens's text, which was serialised in his weekly publication, Master Humphrey's Clock, but in one of the novel's accompanying illustrations, rendered by Hablot K. Browne, popularly known as "Phiz".

In an illustration for Chapter 28, Mrs. Jarley, the proprietress of a waxworks, is shown training the heroine, Little Nell, to be a guide. Although the novel is set some fifteen years before 1840, Browne was no doubt inspired by Madame Tussauds' London waxworks, where the exhibit of Edward Oxford was a star attraction for that year, to create a contemporary reference. His caricature of the would-be assassin as a wide-eyed, imbecilically grinning youth, clutching a flintlock pistol in his right hand and a pot of beer in his left, with a sheet of paper labelled "Young England" spilling out of his pocket, was easily identifiable by anyone at the time. In the direct line of fire behind him sits a calmly serene Queen Victoria, dressed in her 1838 coronation robes and holding the orb and sceptre. While Oxford's pistol may be pointing in her direction, "Phiz" reassuringly depicts the sovereign as literally far above her attacker, serenely and majestically removed from the lunatic's threat.

Oxford is a major character in Mark Hodder's 2010 novel, The Strange Affair of Spring-Heeled Jack, in which one of his descendants also named Edward Oxford from the year 2202 travels back in time to stop his ancestor from even attempting the act.

Samuel Warren is believed to have used Oxford as a model for his portrait of the shallow, dissolute youth Titbat Tittlemouse in his popular novel Ten Thousand a Year.

Edward Oxford, "Young England" and the assassination attempt are plot elements in David Morrell's 2015 novel, Inspector of the Dead, which takes place 15 years after the attempt.  In the novel, the second in his Thomas de Quincey series, his detective, Inspector Ryan, is identified as having been one of the constables on the scene at the time of the attempt.

In other media

In 2009, an inaccurate version of the assassination attempt was portrayed in The Young Victoria. While Oxford (played by Josef Altin) is shown firing twice on the royal couple, Prince Albert (Rupert Friend) throws himself in front of Victoria (Emily Blunt) and is wounded by Oxford's second bullet (contradicting the historic record that no bullets were found). A scene in which the police search his lodgings and find newspaper illustrations of the royal pair papering the glass skylight was not included in the theatrical release.

Oxford's assassination attempt is also depicted in the first series finale of the 2016 TV series Victoria, in which Oxford is played by Harry McEntire. Within the show, suggestions are raised that Oxford was acting under the orders of Ernest Augustus, King of Hanover, who would have acceded to the throne if both Victoria and her unborn child were to die; however, it is ultimately concluded that Oxford is delusional and has been writing letters from Hanover to himself.

References

Further reading
 Diamond, Michael, Victorian sensation, Anthem Press, 2003.  .
 Sinclair, Jenny, A Walking Shadow: The Remarkable Double Life of Edward Oxford, Arcade Publications, 2012, .
 Stevens, Mark, Broadmoor Revealed: Victorian Crime and the Lunatic Asylum, Kindle Edition, 2011,

External links
  Biography of Edward Oxford
 Biography
 
 

1822 births
English emigrants to Australia
Failed regicides
Failed assassins
People acquitted by reason of insanity
People acquitted of treason
People from Birmingham, West Midlands
1900 deaths
People detained at Broadmoor Hospital